Pouākani is a Māori iwi of New Zealand. They have a marae at Mokai, north of Lake Taupo.

See also
List of Māori iwi

References